The 2018 United States Senate election in North Dakota took place on November 6, 2018, to elect a member of the United States Senate to represent the State of North Dakota, concurrently with other elections to the U.S. Senate, as well as other federal, state and local elections in North Dakota.

Incumbent Democratic-NPL Senator Heidi Heitkamp ran for reelection to a second term. The candidate filing deadline was April 9, 2018, and the primary election was held on June 12, 2018. U.S. Representative Kevin Cramer won the Republican primary to challenge Heitkamp, who ran unopposed in the Democratic primary.

On November 6, 2018, Cramer defeated Heitkamp in the general election, becoming the first Republican to win this seat since 1958. This marked the first time since 1960 that Republicans held both of North Dakota's Senate seats.

Background 
Many observers cited Heitkamp as a vulnerable incumbent Democrat in 2018, as she balanced cooperation with her Democratic colleagues in the U.S. Senate with pleasing her constituents in deeply Republican North Dakota; Donald Trump won in North Dakota by about 36 points. The race was expected to be extremely competitive and some projected it would be the most expensive race in North Dakota history.

Voter ID law and Native Americans disenfranchisement 

On October 9, 2018, the Supreme Court of the United States refused to overturn North Dakota's voter ID law, called HB 1369. This law requires voters to use an ID which lists a street address, and doesn't allow PO boxes as valid addresses. However, many Native American reservations don't use a conventional address system and their inhabitants tend to use PO boxes instead, making a large share of the IDs used by Native Americans invalid. Although both Natives and non-Natives are affected, Native Americans are disproportionately more likely to be affected by HB 1369, and the law has been criticized for disenfranchising Native Americans. The Republican-held state government of North Dakota argued that the law was created to prevent voter fraud, but has been accused of passing the law because Native Americans are likely to vote Democratic.

A group of seven Native American voters led by Richard Brakebill, a U.S. Navy veteran enrolled in the Turtle Mountain Band of Chippewa Indians, challenged HB 1369 as violating the Equal Protection Clause. In the case of Brakebill v. Jaeger, judge Daniel L. Hovland of the District Court of North Dakota ruled in April 2018 that large parts of HB 1369 were unconstitutional, including the prohibition on IDs with PO box addresses.

North Dakota secretary of state Alvin Jaeger appealed the ruling to the Court of Appeals for the Eighth Circuit, and requested a stay on Hovland's ruling. The Eighth Circuit initially rejected Jaeger's stay request, with the primary elections in June 2018 not being affected by HB 1369, but revised its opinion in September 2018 and stayed Hovland's ruling. The plaintiffs filed a motion to the Supreme Court, requesting that they take up the case, but this motion was denied. Consequently, Hovland's ruling remained inoperative and HB 1369 was effective for the November 2018 general elections, with many people without the right ID being unable to vote.

Democratic-NPL primary
The Democratic-NPL Party held their state convention March 16 and 17, during which delegates voted to endorse  Heitkamp for re-election. Although general election ballot access is actually controlled by a primary election, challenger Dustin Peyer did not challenge Heitkamp in the June 2018 primary.

Candidates

Declared
 Heidi Heitkamp, incumbent U.S. Senator

Withdrew
 Dustin Peyer, firefighter and candidate for the state senate in 2016

Endorsements

Results

Republican primary

Candidates

Declared
 Kevin Cramer, U.S. Representative
 Thomas O'Neill, former mayor of Niagara

Withdrew
 Tom Campbell, state senator (endorsed Kevin Cramer)
 Gary Emineth, businessman and former chairman of the North Dakota Republican Party
 Paul Schaffner

Declined
 Rick Becker, state representative and candidate for governor in 2016
 Rick Berg, former U.S. Representative and nominee for U.S. Senate in 2012
 Tammy Miller, businesswoman
 Kathy Neset, member of the North Dakota State Board of Higher Education
 Ed Schafer, former United States Secretary of Agriculture and former governor of North Dakota
 Kelly Schmidt, North Dakota State Treasurer
 Wayne Stenehjem, North Dakota Attorney General and candidate for governor in 2016

Endorsements

Polling

Results

General election

Debates 

Complete video of debate, October 18, 2018

Predictions

Fundraising

Polling
Graphical summary

with Tom Campbell

with Kelly Schmidt

Results

References

External links
Candidates at Vote Smart
Candidates at Ballotpedia
Campaign finance at FEC
Campaign finance at OpenSecrets

Official campaign websites
Heidi Heitkamp (D) for Senate
Kevin Cramer (R) for Senate

2018
North Dakota
United States Senate